Robert James Byrd (July 1, 1930 – July 27, 1990), known by the stage name Bobby Day, was an American singer, multi-instrumentalist, music producer, and songwriter. He is best known for his hit record "Rockin' Robin", written by Leon René under the pseudonym Jimmie Thomas.

Biography
Born in Fort Worth, Texas, United States, Day moved to Los Angeles, California, at the age of 15. His first recording was "Young Girl" in 1949 in the R&B group, The Hollywood Flames, released in 1950 on the Selective Label. He went several years with minor musical success limited to the West Coast. He recorded under numerous other names: The Jets, The Voices, The Sounds, The Crescendos, and as the original "Bob" in the duo Bob & Earl with singer Earl Nelson. As a member of The Flames, he used the stage name Bobby Day. His penned song, "Buzz Buzz Buzz" was that outfit's first and biggest success. In 1957, Day formed his own band called the Satellites, following which he recorded three songs that are seen today as rock and roll classics.

Day's best known songwriting efforts were "Over and Over", later made popular by The Dave Clark Five in 1965, and "Little Bitty Pretty One", popularized by Thurston Harris in 1957, Frankie Lymon in 1960, Clyde McPhatter in 1962, and the Jackson Five in 1972. However, Day is most remembered for his 1958 solo recording of the Hot 100 No. 2 hit, Rockin' Robin, written by Leon Rene under the pseudonym Jimmie Thomas. It sold over one million copies and was awarded a gold record. "Rockin' Robin" was a song covered by Bob Luman at Town Hall Party on October 28, 1958, The Hollies in 1964, Gene Vincent in 1969, Michael Jackson in 1972, and by McFly in 2006.

In 2012–2013, his uncharted recording, "Beep-Beep-Beep", was the musical soundtrack for a Kia Sorento television commercial shown nationwide in the U.S.

Day died of prostate cancer on 27 July 1990, at the age of 60, and is buried in Holy Cross Cemetery in Culver City, California.

Singles

Albums
 Rockin' With Robin (1959)
 The Best of Bobby Day (1984)
 The Original Rockin' Robin (1987)
 The Great Bobby Day (1994)
 Rockin' Robin (1994)
 The Best of Bobby Day (2001)
 The Very Best Of (2016)
 Robins, Bluebirds, Buzzards & Orioles - The Bobby Day Story (2021)

Rockin' With Robin
Rockin' With Robin was Day's first studio album. He released it in 1959 with Little Bitty Pretty One (1957) and Rockin' Robin (1958).

Television appearances
The Dick Clark Show (two episodes) (1958)
American Bandstand (four episodes) (1958)
The Cinnamon Cinder Show (1963)
The Midnight Special (1973)

References

External links
  
 

1930 births
1990 deaths
African-American male songwriters
American rhythm and blues singers
American rock singers
American soul singers
Songwriters from Texas
Jamie Records artists
RCA Victor artists
Class Records artists
Rock and roll musicians
Sue Records artists
People from Fort Worth, Texas
Deaths from cancer in California
Burials at Holy Cross Cemetery, Culver City
20th-century African-American male singers